Ṭūbā is a tree which grows in Jannah (Paradise, Garden) according to Islam.

The term is mentioned in the Quran in Surah Al-Raad, verse 29 : (Those who believed, and work righteousness, Tuba is for them and a beautiful place of (final) return.)also in several Ahadith. 

The holy city of Touba, Senegal, is named after the tree.

The Arabic female given name Tuba or Touba derives also from the name of the tree and is widely used among Muslims in the Muslim world, especially in the Arab world and Turkey.

Hadith
The tree is mentioned in the Hadith collection Sahih al-Bukhari and others.

See also
Plants in Islam
Tuba (given name), a given name derived from the tree
Touba, a city in central Senegal sometimes said to be named for the tree
Sidrat al-Muntaha, a lote tree that marks the end of the seventh heaven in Islam
Zaqqum, a tree in hell
Tree of life, an archetype in many mythologies and religious

References

Islamic eschatology
Trees in mythology
Trees in Islam
Islamic terminology
Jannah